The Cyprus Automobile Association (Cyprus AA or CAA; Greek: Κυπριακός Σύνδεσμος Αυτοκινήτου) is a non-profit organization governed by an elected council. Founded in 1933, it has the aim of offering assistance to the private motorist, in Cyprus and abroad, and to promote the interests of car owners in general. The CAA is a member of the Fédération Internationale de l'Automobile (FIA) and the Alliance Internationale de Tourisme (AIT).

The CAA is also responsible for organising the annual Cyprus Rally, the Troödos Rally (part of the Middle East Rally circuit), and the Cyprus Rally Championship, as well as the  Historic Cyprus Rally.

References

Automobile associations
Automobile associations
1933 establishments in Cyprus
National sporting authorities of the FIA
Clubs and societies in Cyprus